Germany participated in the Eurovision Song Contest 2003 with the song "Let's Get Happy" written by Ralph Siegel and Bernd Meinunger. The song was performed by German pop singer, Louise Hoffner, more commonly referred to as Lou. The German entry for the 2003 contest in Riga, Latvia was selected through the national final Countdown Grand Prix Eurovision 2003, organised by the German broadcaster ARD in collaboration with Norddeutscher Rundfunk (NDR). The national final took place on 7 March 2003 and featured fourteen competing acts with the winner being selected through two rounds of public voting. "Let's Get Happy" performed by Lou was selected as the German entry for Riga after placing second in the top three during the first round of voting and ultimately gaining 38% of the vote in the second round.

In the final of the Eurovision Song Contest, Germany performed in position 10 and placed eleventh out of the 26 participating countries with 53 points.

Background 

Germany has won the contest on one occasion: in 1982 with the song "Ein bißchen Frieden" performed by Nicole. Germany, to this point, has been noted for having competed in the contest more than any other country; they have competed in every contest since the first edition in 1956 except for the 1996 contest when the nation was eliminated in a pre-contest elimination round. In 2002, the German entry "I Can't Live Without Music" performed by Corinna May placed twenty-first out of twenty-four competing songs scoring 21 points.

The German national broadcaster, ARD, broadcasts the event within Germany and delegates the selection of the nation's entry to the regional broadcaster Norddeutscher Rundfunk (NDR). Since 1996, NDR had set up national finals with several artists to choose both the song and performer to compete at Eurovision for Germany. The broadcaster announced that they would organise a multi-artist national final in cooperation to select the German entry for the 2003 Eurovision Song Contest, with the goal of "making people separate from the old image of the song contest in Germany" as well as to "make a huge jump from old-fashioned schlager to modern pop music", as stated by head of German delegation for Eurovision Jürgen Meier-Beer.

Before Eurovision

Countdown Grand Prix Eurovision 2003 
Countdown Grand Prix Eurovision 2003 was the competition that selected Germany's entry for the Eurovision Song Contest 2003. The competition took place on 7 March 2003 at the Ostseehalle in Kiel, hosted by Axel Bulthaupt. Fourteen acts competed during the show with the winner being selected through a public televote. The show was broadcast on Das Erste as well as online via the broadcaster's Eurovision Song Contest website grandprix2003.de. The show was also broadcast in Latvia on LTV1. The national final was watched by 5.6 million viewers in Germany.

Competing entries 
Fifteen artists were selected by an expert panel consisting of NDR representatives from proposals received from record companies and German newspapers and magazines. The fifteen participating acts were announced on 11 January 2003 during a press conference. Among the competing acts was Troje, who were later selected on 25 January 2003 as the 2003 Polish Eurovision entrants with the song "Keine Grenzen – Żadnych granic" meaning they would not be allowed to represent Germany according to the Eurovision rules. On 21 January 2003, Joachim Deutschland was disqualified from the competition due to inappropriate lines in his song "Marie" as well as offensive behaviour towards the Bavarian prime minister Edmund Stoiber in one of his other songs. Five of the acts were also supported by German newspapers and magazines which consisted of BILD (Die Gerd Show), Die tageszeitung (Senait), Frankfurter Allgemeine Sonntagszeitung (DJMDG), Hürriyet (Tagträumer feat. Aynur Aydın) and Yam! (Freistil).

Final
The televised final took place on 7 March 2003. The winner was selected through two rounds of public voting, including options for landline and SMS voting. In the first round of voting, the top three entries were selected to proceed to the second round. The top three entries were. In the second round, the winner, "Let's Get Happy" performed by Lou, was selected. In addition to the performances of the competing entries, winner of the Eurovision Song Contest 2002 Marie N performed her entry "I Wanna", while the German music duo Modern Talking performed their new song "TV Makes the Superstar". Approximately 602,000 votes were cast in the first round, and 367,475 votes were cast in the second round.

Chart release 
Like every year since 1996, a compilation CD with all entries was released. The CD also included the 2002 German entry "I Can't Live Without Music" by Corinna May as well as the winning song of the 2002 Eurovision Song Contest "I Wanna" by Marie N. For the first time since 1999, the winning song failed to enter the German singles charts with only three of the fourteen songs, including the disqualified entry "Marie", reaching the top 100.

At Eurovision
During the allocation draw on 29 November 2002, Germany was drawn to perform in position ten, following Cyprus and preceding Russia. At the conclusion of the final, Germany placed eighth in the final, scoring 53 points. As a member of the "Big Four" (France, Germany, Spain and the United Kingdom), Germany automatically qualified to compete in the final of the 2004 Eurovision Song Contest.

In Germany, the show was broadcast on Das Erste which featured commentary by Peter Urban, as well as on Deutschlandfunk and NDR 2 which featured commentary by Thomas Mohr. The German spokesperson, who announced the top 12-point score awarded by the German televote, was Axel Bulthaupt.

Voting 
Below is a breakdown of points awarded to Germany and awarded by Germany in the contest, and the breakdown of the voting conducted during the show. Germany awarded its 12 points to Poland in the contest.

After Eurovision
In an interview at the aftershow party of the Eurovision Song Contest, Lou was asked why she did not reach a better position. She answered that she was “too old, too fat and too ugly”. That quote made it to the front page of BILD the Monday after the contest. Previously, Lou had made it to front page of that newspaper stating that she lost weight for Riga and reduced her wrinkles with Botox.

References

External links 

John Kenney O'Connor: Eurovision Song Contest - Das offizielle Buch zu 50 Jahren europäischer Popgeschichte, Gondrom 2005
The 2003 German national final at eurovision.de

2003
Countries in the Eurovision Song Contest 2003
Eurovision
Eurovision